Pin Oak Township is located in Madison County, Illinois, in the United States. As of the 2010 census, its population was 3,916 and it contained 1,379 housing units.

History
Pin Oak Township was named from a grove of pin oak trees.

Geography

Demographics

References

External links
City-data.com
Illinois State Archives

Townships in Madison County, Illinois
Townships in Illinois